In the 1880s and 1890s, Germany built nine unprotected cruisers in three classes. These ships proved to be transitional designs, and experience gathered with them and a series of avisos helped to produce the first light cruisers of the German Navy. The unprotected cruisers, generally designed for service in Germany's colonial empire, required great endurance and relatively heavy firepower. The first ships of the type, the two s, were acquired in an effort to modernize an aged cruiser force that relied primarily on old sail frigates. The new ships were primarily steam-powered but retained auxiliary sailing rigs.

All nine cruisers served extensively in Germany's colonies and foreign interests, particularly in Africa, Asia, and the Pacific. They participated in the suppression of numerous rebellions, including the Abushiri Revolt in German East Africa in 1889–90, the Boxer Uprising in China in 1900–1901, and the Sokehs Rebellion in the Caroline Islands in 1911. Of the remaining seven ships, only  and  remained abroad at the start of World War I in August 1914. Cormoran was stationed in Tsingtao, but her engines were worn out, so she was scuttled to prevent her capture. Geier briefly operated against British shipping in the Pacific before running low on coal. She put into Hawaii, where she was interned by the US Navy. After the United States declared war on Germany in April 1917, she was seized and commissioned into American service as USS Schurz, though she was accidentally sunk in a collision in June 1918. , employed as a mine storage hulk in Wilhelmshaven during the war, was destroyed by an accidental explosion in 1917. The first three ships were all broken up for scrap in the early 1920s, while Gefion was briefly used as a freighter, before she too was scrapped, in 1923.



Schwalbe class

Prior to the mid-1880s, the German  (Imperial Navy) had built two types of cruising vessels; small avisos suitable for short-range service with the main fleet, and larger, sail-and-steam-powered screw corvettes that could serve on long-range patrols of the German colonial empire. The first unprotected cruisers of the German fleet, the Schwalbe-class cruisers, were designed in 1886 to replace the motley collection of old sailing ships that Germany then relied upon to patrol the overseas empire. Leo von Caprivi, then the Chief of the Kaiserliche Marine, requested cruisers that had the range to operate abroad, but which also possessed sufficient combat power to be useful in time of war; the old sailing ships so poorly armed that they were ineffective as combat ships. Schwalbe and Sperber were therefore armed with a main battery of eight  guns.

Both ships served abroad for the majority of their careers, primarily in Germany's African colonies and in Asia and the Pacific. Their service lives were generally uneventful, apart from the normal routine of colonial policing. They were both sent to German East Africa to help put down the Abushiri Revolt in 1889–1890, and Schwalbe joined the Eight Nation Alliance against the Boxer Uprising in China in 1900. Both ships were decommissioned by 1911 and were thereafter used for secondary roles: Schwalbe as a training ship and Sperber as a target ship. After World War I, both vessels were sold and broken up for scrap by 1922.

Bussard class

The Kaiserliche Marine designed the Bussard class in 1888 as an improved version of the Schwalbe class; like their predecessors, the Bussards were intended purely for colonial duty and were named for birds. They were larger and faster, with a comparable cruising radius and the same number and caliber of guns, though all but the first ship were equipped with new quick-firing models. The Bussard class was also the last cruiser design to incorporate a sailing rig in the German Navy.

All five ships served extensively in Germany's colonial possessions in Africa, Asia, and the Pacific. Seeadler participated in the suppression of the Boxer Uprising in 1900, Falke participated in the Venezuelan crisis of 1902–1903, and Condor and Cormoran helped to defeat the Sokehs Rebellion in the Caroline Islands in 1911. Bussard and Falke were scrapped in 1912, while Seeadler and Condor returned to Germany in 1914 to be decommissioned. Cormoran and Geier remained in the Pacific at the outbreak of World War I; the former's engines were worn out and she was scuttled in Tsingtao. Geier briefly attacked British shipping in the Pacific and tried to link up with the main body of Admiral Maximilian von Spee's East Asia Squadron, but put into Hawaii after running out of fuel. She was interned, seized by the US Navy in 1917, and commissioned as USS Schurz; she briefly served in the US Navy before she was accidentally rammed and sunk by a freighter in June 1918. Meanwhile, Seeadler was destroyed by an accidental explosion in 1917. Condor was the only member of the class to survive the war; she was broken up for scrap in 1921.

Gefion

Gefion was the last unprotected cruiser built for the Kaiserliche Marine; she was in fact a smaller version of contemporary protected cruisers like . The designers attempted to build a hybrid vessel that could serve as a fleet scout and as an overseas cruiser, mainly due to a smaller naval budget, which limited the navy's ability to acquire ships optimized for each role. The resulting design was unsatisfactory, since the requirements for the roles were contradictory. For example, powerful engines necessary for the high top speeds needed in a fleet scout were also very coal hungry, which reduced the ship's endurance; a long cruising radius was mandatory for ships intended to police Germany's far-flung colonial empire, however.

Construction of the ship was extended due to ventilation problems discovered during sea trials, which necessitated lengthy modifications. She spent the first two and a half years in Germany before being deployed to the East Asia Squadron at the end of 1897. She was present during the Boxer Uprising and took part in the Battle of Taku Forts in 1900. Gefion returned to Germany in late 1901, where she was modernized and then placed in reserve. She was to be recommissioned after the start of World War I, but shortages of personnel prevented her return to active service. Instead, she was used as a barracks ship. After the war, she was converted into a freighter and renamed Adolf Sommerfeld, though the conversion was not particularly successful and she was scrapped in 1923.

Notes

Footnotes

Citations

References

Further reading
 
 

Unprotected cruisers
German unprotected cruisers